Javier Edgardo Cámpora (born 7 January 1980 in Rosario) is a former Argentine football player who played as a striker.

Career 
He is a striker who has played professional football in Argentina, Uruguay, Chile, Mexico and Aris in  Greece.

Cámpora's most notable achievement to date, was becoming the top scorer in the Apertura 2005 tournament of the Argentine Primera. He scored 13 goals despite the fact that Tiro Federal finished 19th and was relegated to Primera B Nacional.

Aris
In 21, January 2009 he signed a 1-and-a-half year contract with Aris  After nine games in Super League Greece (season 2008–09) he achieved to score five times. After having bad times with the club's former coach, Iomar Mazinho, he finally found his position on the team with the coming of Héctor Cúper. He scored 11 times in 26 games at the Greek Superleague, including two goals against PAOK and two for the Greek Cup (season 2009–2010). In April 2010 he signed a two-year contract with Aris but unexpectedly two months later he left from the club for personal reasons.

Later years
One month later he signed on Chilian giants Colo-Colo but he failed to become a part of the team although he scored 4 goals on 13 matches. After leaving Colo-Colo he signed with Argentinian Huracan where although he had very good presence, 20 matches – 11 goals, the club finally relegated after a 2–0 loss from Gimnasia La Plata in Argentina's relegation playoffs in June 2011.

Veria 
Cámpora debuted for Veria on 24 August 2014 against Skoda Xanthi. He also played as a team regular in matchday 2 against OFI in Heraklion. He scored his first goal against Kerkyra on 14 August 2014 equalizing Javito's early goal. He scored his second goal for Veria in the Greek Cup first matchday against Ermionida. He scored his second league goal against PAS Giannina with a close header after Battión's first header in the six yard box. Cámpora scored his third goal for Veria in a 2–2 home draw against Panionios with an amazing bicycle kick which was named as the best goal of 9th matchday. Cámpora has also provide three assists to his teammates. He scored his fourth championship goal in a 2–0 home win against Platanias during the thirteen round of Superleague, taking the rebound from Ben's 35 yard shot. Cámpora scored the opening goal in a 2–0 home win against Niki Volos. Javier scored again, in a 2–1 away defeat against Panionios during the Greek Cup. Cámpora's contract was set to expire on 31 June 2015 but it was terminated after mutual consistency on 26 May 2015. During his spell at Veria he scored five times, had three assists and appeared in twenty eight league games. He also scored twice in four appearances in the Greek Cup.

References

External links
 Statistics at Irish Times
 Javier Cámpora at BDFA.com.ar 
  

Living people
1980 births
Argentine footballers
Argentine expatriate footballers
Association football forwards
Footballers from Rosario, Santa Fe
Argentine Primera División players
Uruguayan Primera División players
Liga MX players
Super League Greece players
Chilean Primera División players
Rosario Central footballers
Tiro Federal footballers
Centro Atlético Fénix players
Cruz Azul footballers
Chiapas F.C. footballers
Club Puebla players
Aris Thessaloniki F.C. players
Veria F.C. players
Colo-Colo footballers
Club Atlético Huracán footballers
All Boys footballers
Deportes Concepción (Chile) footballers
Argentine expatriate sportspeople in Chile
Expatriate footballers in Chile
Expatriate footballers in Greece
Expatriate footballers in Uruguay
Expatriate footballers in Mexico
Argentine expatriate sportspeople in Greece
Argentine expatriate sportspeople in Mexico